Reinhard Paul Nothnagel (born 25 September 1997) is a South African rugby union player for the  in Super Rugby, the  in the Currie Cup and the  in the Rugby Challenge. His regular position is lock.

References

Alumni of Monument High School
South African rugby union players
Living people
1997 births
People from Krugersdorp
Rugby union locks
Golden Lions players
South Africa Under-20 international rugby union players
Rugby union players from Gauteng
Lions (United Rugby Championship) players